Paesana is a comune (municipality) in the Province of Cuneo in the Italian region Piedmont, located about  southwest of Turin and about  northwest of Cuneo.

Paesana borders the following municipalities: Barge, Oncino, Ostana, Sampeyre, and Sanfront.

Demographic evolution

References

Cities and towns in Piedmont